The Apprentice 5 is the fifth season of The Apprentice, with Donald Trump as the executive producer and host. Applications were available online (as in previous seasons) and filming occurred in the fall of 2005. Sean Yazbeck was named the winner and hired by Donald Trump as the new Apprentice during the season finale. Lee Bienstock, the runner-up to Yazbeck, proved to be very competitive and was hired outside of television a few months later.

This season of the show was the first to not rank in the Top 50 according to Nielsen ratings and the first to garner less than 10 million viewers on average; it ranked #51 with an average of 9.73 million viewers. This was the last season to have George H. Ross and Carolyn Kepcher as main boardroom judges, although Ross's role was largely taken over by Bill Rancic in this season. The show moved to Los Angeles, California the following season and Donald Trump's children became the most prominent judges after him.

The Apprentice 5 on Monday February 27, 2006, right after the new hit game show Deal or No Deal. NBC, facing a ratings slump, opted to put future seasons of the show on Monday nights (as opposed to its past Thursday 9 pm ET slot). The network hoped to build the show's audience by making this move, as the program had witnessed a fairly substantial erosion in ratings since The Apprentice 1. However, the show faced tough competition with the Fox's fifth season of 24. The finale for The Apprentice 5 took place in Los Angeles on June 5, 2006. Season five's finale was the lowest rated ever, down 23% from season four and down 28% from season three's final episode (in the important 18–49 demographic).

The Apprentice 5 marked the debut of Donald Trump's children, Ivanka Trump and Donald Trump, Jr. as boardroom judges when either George and/or Carolyn were unavailable. Jack McConnell, the First Minister of Scotland, makes an appearance in one of the episodes.

For the first time in Apprentice history, all episodes of this season (including the Clipshow with never-seen-before footage) could be obtained at iTunes for indefinite viewing after the episode has aired.

Candidates
This is the first season where not all of the candidates were exclusively American; this season contained cast members that were originally from Uzbekistan and the United Kingdom.

Team selections
As with the previous season of the show, Trump hand-picked the candidates. Furthermore, Trump personally selected Tarek and Allie to be the very first project managers and to draft their own teams before the first task is issued. This is the first time in the history of The Apprentice that the teams were not formed by a certain set of characteristics, such as gender (Seasons 1, 2, 4) or educational status (Season 3).

Because this process was conducted after only preliminary introductions, some reasoning for certain selections had been somewhat arbitrary—such as Tarek picking Dan because he was a father, or Allie picking Tammy because she had the qualities of "a real tiger". For the first time since the original season of the show, the successful project managers would not be exempt from firing the next week, therefore everyone had to do a satisfactory job in order to be safe.

Using alternate selections, one at a time, both of them picked their respective teams in the following order:

Weekly results

 The candidate was on the losing team.
 The candidate was hired and won the competition.
 The candidate won as project manager on his/her team.
 The candidate lost as project manager on his/her team.
 The candidate was brought to the final boardroom.
 The candidate was fired.
 The candidate lost as project manager and was fired.
 The candidate did not participate in the task.

Episodes

Week 1: Summer of Sam's Club
Airdate: February 27, 2006
Sponsor: Goodyear Tire and Rubber Company
Hosting Company: Sam's Club
Prologue: Trump arrived at Republic Airport in New York where George and Carolyn were waiting to introduce him to the new candidates aboard his jet. Back on the tarmac, Trump had each candidate say a few words about him or herself.
Task: Teams had to promote a Sam's Club store and sell the most memberships. Teams could also use a Goodyear Blimp for promotional purposes.
Judges: Donald Trump; Carolyn Kepcher; George H. Ross
Trump Monologue Change The Team People that are successful always know when to pull somebody that makes the team fail.
Gold Rush project manager: Tarek
Synergy project manager: Allie
Winning team: Synergy
Reasons for win: Synergy used their blimp to advertise freebies given at Sam's Club over Gold Rush's simple marketing techniques. They had also sold 43 new memberships over Gold Rush's 40 new memberships.
Reward: Lunch at the Penn Club of New York with Donald Trump
Losing team: Gold Rush
Reasons for loss: Summer's attitude was questionable, practically giving up during the task and making only one phone call while she was supposed to make as many as possible, claiming that she could not call the local businesses and restaurants during their dinner rush. She also demonstrated a lack of confidence in her team's ability to win before the boardroom, even though they only lost by 3 memberships. Duffle bags were also misrepresented as gift bags, which had nothing inside them and were given away for free (instead of an exchange for a new membership), as declared by Tarek to Carolyn during the task.
Sent to boardroom: Tarek, Summer, Lenny, Lee.
Firing verdict: Trump noted how Lee and Lenny were laughing at Tarek's bad decisions, especially the fact that he continued to defend the empty gift bags as being a good idea. He also couldn't get Tarek to give any reasonable cause for Lee and Lenny to even be in the final boardroom, vindicating them. However, Summer suddenly interrupted Trump, which brought the attention back to her. Although Trump openly stated he was "ready to practically" fire Tarek, Summer continued her attempt to defend him, which caused Trump to lose his patience and, given Summer's lack of judgement and little contributions in the task, he decided to fire Summer instead without any hesitation. Despite Tarek's poor performance as project manager, it was deduced that Summer's poor boardroom logic, unsatisfactory performance, and bad attitude made her the obvious choice to be fired.
Fired: Summer Zervos  – for having a terrible attitude, doing little to help her team throughout the task and for her interjections in the boardroom.
Notes:
In an Apprentice first, Trump personally chose two candidates (Allie and Tarek) to be project managers for the first task and asked both of them to form the teams.
At first, Brent suggested that his team name should be Killer Instinct, but project manager Allie went with Pepi's idea, Synergy. Tarek named his team Gold Rush.
Tarek came under fire for bringing in Lee and Lenny into the boardroom, for it seemed that Tarek only brought in Lee for personal reasons (after Lee voiced his concerns about Tarek) and Lenny had done what he was told to do, therefore they didn't deserve to be in the boardroom. Tarek claimed that Lenny did not contribute to the task, but Lenny had been in the blimp and utilized his information of the area which George confirmed to Tarek.
Summer came under strong criticism by Carolyn in the boardroom, but had been seemingly saved (at first) by Lenny's spirited defense.
After Summer's firing, Trump warned Tarek that he did not make it by much, and was only saved by Summer's interruptions; Lenny responded by saying "Not for long". He also said to his advisors after the firing that Tarek was totally overrated. 
Most of the team actually thought that Tarek didn't deserve to be fired despite not making smart decisions. The team thought Summer should have been fired. 
Episode One Recap on NBC.com

Week 2: The Razor's Edge
Airdate: March 6, 2006
Sponsor: Gillette Fusion
Hosting Company: Procter & Gamble
Task: Teams had to promote the Gillette Fusion razor blade by asking people to text message a key word to their number. The winner would be determined by the largest number of text messages produced.
Judges: Donald Trump; Bill Rancic; Ivanka Trump
Gold Rush project manager: Lee
Synergy project manager: Pepi
Pain of the Task: After Stacy interrupted him several times during a planning conversation for product advertisement, Brent angrily confronted her outside their workspace and Stacy made a big deal out of it after she felt threatened by him. This caused a lot of friction within the team and wasted a great deal of their time. In addition, Pepi could not control the situation and further animosity spread throughout Synergy. It was suggested at one point that Pepi should send Brent back to the suite, but Pepi chose not to and tried to bring him back into the group with mixed success.
Winning team: Gold Rush, with 683 text messages.
Reasons for win: There was an initial split on the team due to Lee wanting to take the time to research and develop a full marketing strategy, while Lenny wanted to get out on the streets early and adapt to the situation as the day went on. Ultimately, Lee conceded that Lenny's idea was the correct one, and Gold Rush started early and chose a great location.
Reward: Aiding non-profit organization Career Gear in its mission to motivate men who are disadvantaged, and helping them find and keep jobs that will support them and their families, as well as dressing them in better clothes.
Losing team: Synergy, with 458 text messages.
Reasons for loss: Synergy didn't wake up as early as the other team to get started on the task, and Trump claimed Gold Rush already had received 100 text messages by the time Synergy got out on the street. Gold Rush had scouted their locale beforehand, but Synergy relied on Stacy (a native New Yorker) to pick the location. Although both teams had set up bases in the theater district of Times Square, Gold Rush's area was clearly superior, and the area that Stacy picked was too busy for people to get their attention. Michael's idea of wearing bathrobes to market the Gillette Fusion did not work out as he had planned and was not seen as an appropriate way to represent the product. Most of the messages that they did earn were attracted in a bizarre fashion by Brent, who decided to put on a makeshift display of break-dancing, and the other Synergy members were able to get texts from the crowds of people who showed up to watch the spectacle.
Dramatic tension: Synergy questioned Brent's mental stability, and they were completely turned off by his social awkwardness and abnormal behavior. Stacy also caused doubt in her teammates after she retracted what she said about the ordeal with Brent, saying that she wasn't threatened by him (although she had said that during the task).
Sent to boardroom: Pepi, Brent, Stacy, Michael
Firing verdict: Although Michael made a huge mistake with his idea of wearing the bathrobes during and even attempted to dissociate himself from the idea in the boardroom (blaming Pepi for authorizing it), Trump thought Michael had potential and felt he should stay. Trump warned Michael, however, that "if you do it again, you'll be fired so fast your head will spin". While Brent was in jeopardy for confronting Stacy and causing animosity, Trump gave him a second chance because Brent wasn't responsible for the loss, nor was it his responsibility to lead; it was Pepi's. He also warned Brent that he would not last much longer in the competition and most likely be one of the next contestants to be fired.
Fired:
Stacy Schneider – for choosing a bad location, not taking responsibility for her actions, and for her exaggerated reaction to Brent's confrontation. Trump surmised that location is extremely important, and the wrong location proved to be Synergy's fatal mistake. Trump also refused to believe that Stacy, a criminal defense attorney, could be scared of Brent. He told her before firing her "if you can't handle Brent then you can't handle the business of running one of my companies.”
Pepi Diaz – for not leading the team well, not being able to get his team out to a good start, and for losing the respect of the team after not knowing how to handle Brent and Stacy's conflict.
Notes:
Usually, multiple-firings outside the interview portion of the boardroom were unannounced, but since the initial boardroom hearings stated that the team lost because of unsatisfactory teamwork, overall team performance, and losing by almost a 50% margin, Trump told the team that he would fire two people (in an Apprentice first) as punishment for the crushing defeat, and made this very clear after Pepi announced who he would bring back.
This is the first time that neither George or Carolyn appear with Donald Trump. Instead, Ivanka Trump fills in for Carolyn Kepcher and Bill Rancic fills in for George H. Ross on this task.
In the boardroom, nearly all of Synergy blamed Brent's disruptive behavior on the first day for the loss, with only Brent (who was defending himself) and Roxanne arguing otherwise. Bill called out the team for blaming Brent, adding that Pepi ( and the rest of the team to a lesser extent ) needed to work on management skills and should have taken action if Brent had been such difficulty during the task.
Brent said during the boardroom that he was a "star" on the task because most of the messages that they did earn were attracted by Brent through his break-dancing, and although nobody argued against this, nobody in the boardroom gave him any credit for that.
Episode Two Recap on NBC.com

Week 3: Get It In Gear
Airdate: March 13, 2006
Sponsor: Chevrolet Tahoe
Hosting Company: General Motors
Task: Teams had to promote the new 2007 Chevy Tahoe by creating a corporate retreat for the General Motors (GM) executives. The winner would be determined through judgment by the GM executives, rather than by score. The GM executives were judging the teams based on three criteria: interactivity, informational values, and motivational value.
Judges: Donald Trump; Carolyn Kepcher; Bill Rancic
Gold Rush project manager: Theresa
Synergy project manager: Andrea
Winning team: Synergy
Reasons for win: Sean had come up with a solid theme for the event with several different physical attractions to complement the retreat. Although Synergy had to scrap their physical attraction of skeet shooting after the park manager forbid the use of firearms due to safety concerns, Andrea was able to come up with a golf-cart race, in addition to their other attractions of rock climbing, fly fishing, and a car tour of the 2007 Chevy Tahoe as their team's product knowledge. The team's execution of the task went far more smoothly than their competitors, who were riddled with problems throughout their retreat.
Reward: Going to Atlantis Marine World to swim with the sharks
Losing team: Gold Rush
Reasons for loss: Charmaine unintentionally sabotaged the project when she ignorantly hired a crude comedienne, Cory Kahaney, to entertain the GM executives during lunch. Kahaney's inappropriate jokes offended the executives and ruined the class of the event. Furthermore, Charmaine still paid Kahaney her full fee of $1,700 without any argument. Although Theresa named Tarek as the team's creative point person, she blocked every suggestion that Tarek made, which meant not getting astroturf for the poorly developed golf course and ignoring Tarek's warning about having a cohesive theme for the event. Instead, Theresa came up with a horse and buggy retreat, which was out of place with the Chevy Tahoe. Theresa also failed to have someone from the team explain the Chevy Tahoe's new features to the executives, leaving it to the unadvised models that Charmaine hired to explain it themselves. Although she appointed Bryce to tell the models about the Chevy Tahoe and its features, this happened only 20 minutes before the event started, and the models did not have enough time to learn the correct information and present the car properly.
Sent to boardroom: Theresa, Lenny, Tarek
Fired:  Theresa Boutross – for bringing Lenny and not Charmaine or Bryce into the boardroom, whose critical roles in the task were the ultimate reason they lost. In the absence of Charmaine and Bryce, Theresa's weak leadership skills, lack of knowledge and focus, along with not coming up with a good theme for the Chevy Tahoe retreat were also mentioned as grounds for her termination.
Notes:
Andrea became so upset when Brent came back from the boardroom that she locked herself in the bathroom and cried hysterically. An instance where a candidate's feelings became so hurt due to a candidate coming back from the boardroom had not been shown before. She ultimately gave him relatively unimportant "busy work" tasks to do so he'd feel like he was contributing and wouldn't bother her during the task.
This episode (which was taped October 3–5, 2005) took place during the observance of Rosh Hashanah. In an Apprentice first, two Jewish contestants — Lee Bienstock and Dan Brody – took the task off in observance. George H. Ross, who also observed Rosh Hashanah, was again replaced by Bill Rancic. One contestant, Lenny Veltman, revealed that he too was Jewish, but didn't take the day off, citing that the holiday was not an excuse for them to not do their job. He also mentioned that Israel Defense Forces soldiers stay on duty during the High Holidays and was very critical of Dan and Lee for taking time off. It was also revealed that contestants Brent Buckman and Allie Jablon were also Jewish, but they did not take the task off either.
During the task, Bryce and Theresa were infuriated that Lenny did not secure an electrical generator for the event. Despite the fact that it was never disclosed if power was readily available for the team to use in their event, his teammates assumed that Lenny would have learned this beforehand as it was his responsibility to set up the stage. An electric generator was ultimately needed for their presentation of the Chevy Tahoe, and Bryce was able to get one secured at the last minute. When Bryce and Theresa went after Lenny in the boardroom for this oversight, their efforts backfired after Trump deduced that simply securing electricity did not cause the team to fail. It was heavily implied that Theresa brought Lenny back because he was so "flippant" and that he stated that securing electricity was "not his problem."
Bill brought up why Bryce was not brought back for the final boardroom, because Theresa put him in charge for the golf event (along with Tarek) and informing the models about the Chevy Tahoe. Theresa refused to blame Bryce for the models being uninformed, acknowledging that she had left it too late to assign him to tell the models about the Tahoe, and that Charmaine was the one who was actually responsible.
After Theresa was fired Tarek told Mr Trump he promised to step it up to which Trump replied "you better step it up if you can."
It was heavily implied that had Charmaine been brought back into the boardroom, she would have certainly been fired.
Episode Three Recap on NBC.com

Week 4: Cereal Killer
Airdate: March 20, 2006
Hosting Company: Post Cereals
Task: Teams had to design a billboard ad to promote a new cereal: Post's Grape-Nuts Trail Mix Crunch. Once again, teams would be evaluated by the Post executives, rather than by a score.
Judges: Donald Trump; George H. Ross; Ivanka Trump
Gold Rush project manager: Charmaine
Synergy project manager: Tammy
Winning team: Gold Rush
Reasons for win: Charmaine and Bryce came up with a simple, but effective concept showing a runner pouring a box of Trail Mix Crunch down their throat. In addition, Charmaine's presentation to the Post executives was very concise and professional.
Reward: Getting to prepare a meal with the world-famous chef, Jean-Georges at the Trump International Hotel and Tower.
Losing team: Synergy
Reasons for loss: Tammy's concept was too dense, and the advertisement that Andrea made was too cluttered. In addition, their ad had too many different colors, graphics, fonts, and was out of sync with their models. Their slogan was also too long, and they had a terrible slideshow that Sean made, along with a billboard that executives did not believe would be very effective.
Sent to boardroom: No final boardroom – While it was discussed that Andrea, Tammy, and Sean were directly responsible for the task's failure, Brent's uncouth comment over Tammy's leadership led to his entire team denouncing him yet again, and gave Trump no reason to let him continue in the process.
Fired: Brent Buckman – for his aggressive manner and for being universally hated by his team. While Brent was not responsible for the loss in any fashion after being marginalized by his team, Trump ultimately realized that Brent was too big of a negative influence for his team to continue successfully in the interview process.
Notes:
Charmaine became emotional and regretful after realizing that Theresa had been fired in the previous episode mainly for not bringing her back into the boardroom.
When asked about his opinion on Tammy's leadership in the boardroom, Brent stated that she "stank" and that "it smells right over here" in regard to her poor performance. This statement drew ire from his team, along with Trump and his advisors for being so crude. He later accused Tammy of saying that he was "too fat" to present but Tammy denied this, stating that she could not let Brent present a healthy brand of cereal when he did not appear healthy himself. Trump agreed with Tammy's logic, saying that were he launching a health food product, he would likely have Ivanka handle any presentation.
Trump strongly implied that had Brent not insulted Tammy, then Andrea would have been fired for making the bad advertisement, along with several teammates (particularly Roxanne and Allie) accusing her of having been a poor team leader the previous week despite Synergy's win. While Tammy came up with the initial concept, her leadership was near-unanimously praised by Ivanka and the other Synergy members, and despite Sean's bad presentation, Trump said that Synergy would have lost the task regardless of how well he presented due to the faults in the advert itself. 
Several members of Synergy prior to the boardroom had actually concluded that going for Brent in the boardroom would be a waste of time since he had been delegated no major responsibilities throughout the task. Andrea and Tammy planned to call out Brent for underachieving and force him to be a project manager, much as Sam Solovey had been more or less recruited to be a PM in Week 3 of Season 1 after his terrible first two efforts and left to either put up or shut up (Sam lost dismally as the PM and was fired). Ivanka noted that it was Brent's insult to Tammy that opened the floodgates and encouraged the rest of the team to attack him. 
Trump later commented that Synergy would be a much stronger team moving forward without Brent's negative influence.
Ivanka Trump again filled in for Carolyn Kepcher in this task.
In his exit interview, Brent continued to bad-mouth Synergy.
Before being fired, Brent had claimed that he had saved Synergy time and time again, and that without him they would have lost all four tasks instead of winning two and losing two; Ironically, Synergy would go on a winning streak for the next four weeks of tasks and 6 out of the remaining 9 tasks.
Episode Four Recap on NBC.com

Week 5: Cruise Control
Airdate: March 27, 2006
Hosting Company: Norwegian Cruise Lines
Task: Teams had to create a 30-second commercial to promote the Norwegian Jewel of Norwegian Cruise Lines. Teams also had to be finished filming the scenes of the commercial per the Norwegian Jewel's departure time, which was 3p.m. Eastern time.
Judges: Donald Trump; Carolyn Kepcher; Bill Rancic
Gold Rush project manager: Dan
Pain of the Task: Dan declared himself the project manager of Gold Rush as soon as the task began, much to the annoyance of Leslie and Bryce, who felt their backgrounds made them better qualified to lead this particular task. He subsequently proved an extremely abrasive leader, yet proved rather indecisive at times and ultimately allowed Tarek to take control of most of the task.
Synergy project manager: Roxanne
Winning team: Synergy
Reasons for win: Their ad intrigued, but was clear.
Reward: Getting to visit the Brinks vault, and taking home $30,000 worth of diamonds.
Losing team: Gold Rush
Reasons for loss: Although both teams had bold presentations, the executives did not like that Gold Rush used text instead of a voice-over in the commercial, which was Tarek's idea. Also, Gold Rush did not make the connection with the concept they had used, which was built off of Lenny's idea of a castaway that is rescued by the ship, which made the commercial unclear and unappealing.
Boardroom tension: A huge boardroom battle flared, with Dan and Tarek criticizing Leslie and Lee for not stepping up. Leslie in turn accused Dan of not listening to her advice despite her having worked in the broadcasting industry, while Lee said that he had tried to step up, but Dan had shown little interest in listening to anyone but Tarek. Carolyn cut off the fight by saying everyone sounded like they were "ridiculous 10 year olds."
Sent to boardroom: Dan, Lee, Tarek. After Trump suggested bringing back a third person, Dan considered bringing back Lenny as well, but ultimately decided not to after admitting that Lee and Lenny would gang up on him.
Internal review: Trump and Bill considered firing Tarek for not using the voice-over in their commercial (in addition to his past errors in previous tasks), but Carolyn thought that Dan should be eliminated because he chose the concept of their ad. Although it was Lenny's initial premise, Dan did not bring Lenny into the boardroom, therefore taking the burden of Lenny's bad concept.
Fired: Dan Brody – for showing a terrible quality of leadership, having no ability to control his teammates, for bringing Lee in the boardroom for what were seen as personal reasons, and for not bringing Lenny back in otherwise, for he had the idea for their awful commercial. Even though this had been Tarek's third appearance in the boardroom, and Trump himself acknowledged that Tarek had done exceptionally awful throughout the interview process, Trump still saw potential in Tarek and ultimately fired Dan for being the leader and managing the uninteresting commercial.
Notes:
During the final boardroom while discussing why Lee was in the boardroom, Trump called him a politician given his speech skills. While Trump said he wasn't a fan of politicians, he also said that he doesn't hate them either. Trump also stated that he did not see Lee responsible for the loss and made it clear that he wouldn't be fired. 
After Dan's firing, Trump requested Lee and Tarek to warn Lenny that he would not last long.
Trump mocked Tarek and the requirements to be a member at Mensa, given the excessive number of mistakes that Tarek has made throughout the entire interview process. Tarek further harmed his own cause when it was revealed that he told Dan that almost everyone would be against him and he wouldn't advocate for Dan, making it seem like Tarek was not very loyal.
Episode Five Recap on NBC.com

Week 6: King of the Jingle
Airdate: April 3, 2006
Hosting Company: Arby's
Task: Teams must create a 30-second jingle for a brand new line of Arby's Chicken Naturals. The teams are given access to recording studios, and professional musicians and the winner would be determined by the executives of Arby's.
Judges: Donald Trump; Carolyn Kepcher; Bill Rancic
Gold Rush project manager: Bryce
Synergy project manager: Sean
Winning team: Synergy
Reasons for win: The executives loved the energy, which fit the whole brand personality of trying to be something different and better.
Reward: A chance to sample a very expensive six course truffle meal at the Alain Ducasse at the Essex House, valued at $4000 USD/lb.—issued from Alba, Italy
Losing team: Gold Rush
Reasons for loss: Gold Rush were late when they met with the executives. In New York City, it is vitally important to allow ample time to approach any important engagement, and it is also very important in business that people are early to a meeting, and the Arby's executives were especially upset when Gold Rush arrived to the meeting 25 minutes late. In addition to getting on the wrong foot with the executives, a key catchphrase was missing in Gold Rush's jingle, which was the fact that Arby's had chicken naturals, a one-of-a-kind for a fast-food establishment.
Sent to boardroom: Bryce, Lee, Lenny
Fired: Bryce Gahagan – for terrible decision making, including being 25 minutes late to the appointment with the executives and not bringing back Tarek and Charmaine, who were responsible for their jingle, instead bringing in Lee and Lenny for reasons that Trump could not possibly fire them for (Lee's religious commitment and Lenny's inability to write jingles, which was excused due to English being his second language).
Notes:
The episode was aired an hour later than its scheduled time.
This task was filmed around Yom Kippur, and Lee took off one day per the observance. Because George Ross also observed Yom Kippur as well, Bill Rancic filled in again for this task. Bryce would later decide to bring back Lee solely because he had taken the day of the task off, a decision which Trump felt showed bad judgement and a total lack of respect for Lee's religion.
When Bill Rancic brought up the tardiness issue in the boardroom, even Donald Trump was surprised to know that Bill Rancic took an initiative to discuss the tardiness incident with the two Arby's executives.
Before the final boardroom, Charmaine was seen sobbing as she took the elevator back to the candidates' suite.
The internal review, a scene which viewers usually watch Trump and his judges discuss the candidates before the final boardroom, was cut from this episode's viewing.
This was the third time this season that the project manager of Gold Rush was fired for not bringing back the candidates responsible for the defeat. Also, this had not been the first time that Charmaine and Tarek were at fault for the team's loss although Bryce continued to defend both after his firing stating that without Tarek they wouldn't have had any music at all and without Charmaine they wouldn't have had any lyrics at all. This baffled Trump and his advisors, specifically Carolyn, who said both Tarek and Charmaine missed the mark, despite working hard. Carolyn even wondered whether Bryce was attempting to engineer his own dismissal, given that Bryce himself admitted that Lee didn't deserve to be fired and that it wasn't really Lenny's fault that he couldn't contribute to the task. She even told Bryce to "just say fire me Mr. Trump."
This is the first time this season that a team has won two consecutive tasks.
Episode Six Recap on NBC.com

Week 7: It's More Than Decor
Airdate: April 10, 2006
Sponsor: Boys and Girls Clubs of America
Hosting Company: Ace Hardware
Task: Teams need to renovate and remodel an old recreational room and transform the space into an interactive recreational room for use in the New Faces for Helpful Places program hosted by both Ace Hardware and Boys and Girls Clubs of America. Sponsors will determine the winner based on three criteria: Creativity, Functionality, and Upgrades.
Judges: Donald Trump; Carolyn Kepcher; Bill Rancic
Gold Rush project manager: Lenny
Synergy project manager: Michael
Winning team: Synergy
Reasons for win: The team created a recreational space that provided much more variety objects as opposed to Gold Rush. Their theme also promoted teamwork, and tied this into their presentation as an important business-based asset.
Reward: Allowing an 8-year-old girl, Dasheaira (who is diagnosed with cancer), to engage in a Toys-R-Us shopping spree, courtesy of the Make-A-Wish Foundation.
Losing team: Gold Rush
Reasons for loss: From the beginning, Lenny failed to take initiative with the project and let his teammates talk with the executives, dismissing the meeting from his agenda. Their theme of music and dance was also too narrow, and because Gold Rush spent only 10 minutes with the executives for a Q&A session, as opposed to Synergy's 45 minutes, Gold Rush failed to capitalize on what the executives wanted. Lenny also left his teammates (Charmaine, Leslie, & Tarek) to do all the constructional work, while himself and Lee went to pick up the equipment and supplies, and Lenny poorly presented the team's room to executives. One of the executives remarked that if all the children played the instruments at the same time, the noise would be chaotic. While the children were visibly delighted with the room Gold Rush had made, the executives still stressed that not everyone would love their theme.
Dramatic tension: Synergy was plagued by Michael's indecisiveness, and the team was irritated after he rambled on with the executives and focused heavily on paint schemes, rather than actually renovating their room. His meticulous attention to detail further complicated the set-up of their simple display, and even though they won, Sean dissociated Michael from the victory even calling him a wanker. After they lost, Lee tried to help Lenny prepare for the boardroom, and they tried to place the blame on Charmaine, claiming she was too talkative and had a negative attitude. In the boardroom, Lenny became extremely defensive when criticized by Bill and Carolyn, his and Lee's attempts to push the blame onto Charmaine infuriated the rest of the team causing them to speak up in her defense, citing his awful leadership as the reason they lost. Lenny then tried to claim this was a conspiracy but was immediately scoffed.
Sent to boardroom: No final boardroom – While Trump did ask Lenny who he'd bring to the boardroom, hinting that he should bring back Leslie for her lack of contributions over the last few tasks, Lenny made a fatal mistake by instead asking to bring back Charmaine (who Trump had already said he did not consider at all responsible for the loss) and Lee (because he would advocate for Lenny to stay). Trump and his advisors declared such a move to be so weak that it gave Trump no choice but to dismiss Lenny.
Fired: Lenny Veltman – For showing very bad leadership, inability to take initiatives or criticism, not going to the meeting properly, for putting the blame all on Charmaine, which Trump, his advisors, and most of Gold Rush did not consider responsible for the loss, for wanting to bring back Lee as an advocate and for being rude and disrespectful to Trump, Bill and Carolyn. In the end, Trump and his advisors unanimously agreed it was an easy elimination for Lenny.
Notes:
Despite Lenny's very bad performance as a project manager, Lee still defended him and even went as far to saying he would fire Charmaine simply because he believed in Lenny. Bill and Carolyn were astounded by Lee's poor business logic, but Trump stated (after the boardroom) that he admired Lee for his loyalty.
After Lenny's elimination, Charmaine tried to apologize to Lenny, but Lenny ignored her as well as accusing her of having "10,000 faces", which she denied ever having.
This is the second time this season that a candidate was fired without the need for a final boardroom. As Trump did initially ask Lenny who he would bring back into the boardroom, it was inferred that Lenny's decision to bring in Lee back in as an advocate was what pushed Trump's decision to fire him. Trump declared the move as disloyal (even if Lee didn't see it as so) and seemed annoyed that Lenny would expose Lee in an attempt to save himself, especially when Lee wholly supported Lenny in the boardroom.
Episode Seven Recap on NBC.com

Week 8: A Slice of Heaven
Airdate: April 10, 2006
Hosting Company: 7-Eleven
Corporate shuffle: Since Gold Rush now had a two-person deficit, Trump asked a volunteer from Synergy to join Gold Rush and even out the teams. When asked, the entire Synergy team stood silently and looked pointedly at Michael, who ultimately raised his hand and joined Gold Rush.
Task: Launch a promotion based on 7-Eleven's brand-new pizza sandwich called P'Eatzza, by using a 7-Eleven Store provided by both The Trump Organization and 7-Eleven. The winner will be determined by the amount of increased sales
Judges: Donald Trump; Carolyn Kepcher; George H. Ross
Gold Rush project manager: Leslie
Pain of the Task: Lee wanted to sell the sandwich at a very low but more reasonable price, but Leslie forbade it even after Lee reported that he overheard some of the 7-Eleven supervisors and managers complaining that the price of the product was abnormally high.
Synergy project manager: Andrea
Winning team: Synergy
Reasons for win: Synergy increased sales by 997%, while Gold Rush only increased sales by 608%. Carolyn didn't like the hats Synergy had, but the price of $4 for one slice and $6 for two slices helped Synergy secure a win and their marketing flyers, as well.
Reward: A luxury flight to Washington, D.C. and a stay at a privileged hotel with New York Senator Chuck Schumer
Losing team: Gold Rush
Reasons for loss: At $7.99 for one piece and $8.99 for two pieces, Gold Rush overpriced the product. Although Carolyn liked their promotional scheme, their price point ultimately cost them a victory.
Sent to boardroom: Leslie and Lee. Despite Trump's recommendation of bringing two people, Leslie decided to only bring in Lee.
Firing Verdict: Leslie and Lee got into a lengthy debate about the price with Lee arguing about lowering the price and Leslie feeling Lee didn't work as hard as everyone else. Trump however agreed with Lee and felt he was not responsible for the loss and felt Leslie brought in Lee for personal reasons and given her past performances, Trump had more than enough evidence to fire her. 
Fired: Leslie Bourgeois – for setting the price of the product too high and not listening to Lee's suggestion to lower the price of the P'Eatzza sandwich, not fully understanding price points or 7-Eleven's ideal market, choosing only Lee to bring back into the boardroom, and for being a generally weak contributor throughout the season.
Notes:
 Indy Racing League driver Tony Kanaan was an official with 7-Eleven, the sponsor of his Andretti Green Racing #11 Honda, and the sponsor of this task.
Lee was visibly distraught when he returned to the suite after Lenny was fired, which disturbed Gold Rush (because they felt it was the first time in the competition that he was showing his youth and inexperience) and Synergy (who didn't like Lenny and did not understand why anyone would be unhappy when he was fired).
Leslie was fired on her birthday.
After being dismissed from the initial boardroom, Charmaine pleaded with Trump to fire Lee, believing that Leslie was a good project manager (albeit the loss) and that Lee let the bad price point hinder his performance in the task.
Andrea admitted that she was a vegetarian throughout this task.
The P'Eatzza's introduction date of April 18, 2006 at American and Canadian 7-Eleven stores was based on the assumption that this episode was going to air on April 17, and then releasing the product the next day. However, a programming shift moved up the show.
As with the sixth week, Trump requested the internal review to be cut from both Yahoo's extended footage and the actual NBC airing.
Episode Eight Recap on NBC.com

Mid-season highlights
Airdate: April 23, 2006 and April 24, 2006 on CNBC
This is mainly just a recap of the first eight episodes of this season plus footage that wasn't seen in the first eight episodes
More backstabbing, more issues brought up by Trump's trusted associates
As with all Season Highlights from the past, Donald Trump is the narrator
This is the only episode that can be downloaded without a charge at the iTunes Store
There's also a preview of what to expect in the final weeks of the "ultimate job interview"
While Canadians will not be able to see the episode on iTunes (because viewing this indefinitely requires a U.S.-based address and credit card in order to access the episode online) the typical CNBC blackout was removed on the 12:00am ET airing only, due to this episode broadcasting only on this channel.

Week 9: Assault on Battery
Airdate: April 24, 2006
Sponsor: Ameriquest
Task: Teams must create a souvenir for a national park in New York City, and then spend the day at Ellis Island selling their souvenirs. Teams are given access to graphics designers from B Squared Design & Print for help in making their souvenirs, and the winner will be determined by the amount of sales made.
Judges: Donald Trump; Ivanka Trump; Donald Trump, Jr.
Gold Rush project manager: Lee
Synergy project manager: Allie
Winning team: Gold Rush, with sales standing at $1,548.68
Reasons for win: Lee divided the team into two groups (Tarek and Michael took pictures for the brochure and Lee and Charmaine focused on getting a sponsor for the brochure) which made it easy to get the brochure done. Plus the design was simple and focused on the history of Ellis Island. The primary reason for the win, however was being able to secure Battery Park first, which gave Gold Rush an easy win as they sold to the people waiting for a ferry.
Reward: Play golf with Donald Trump and Vijay Singh.
Losing team: Synergy, having sales of only $843.40, losing by a margin of 45.5%
Reasons for loss: The team immediately got off to a bad start after Tammy carelessly left her notes that were needed to make the brochures at the Ellis Island Museum, and Synergy ended up getting separated after Allie and Tammy did not find the notes to catch the ferry with the rest of the team. Andrea ended up designing a terrible and complicated looking editorial, despite the fact that she specialized in graphic design. Andrea also claimed to be an expert in bulk sales, but waited until the last half-hour of the task to tell Allie this, where it would have made bulk selling virtually impossible to accomplish. Synergy also got off to a very late start on the day of selling and could not sell their souvenirs at Battery Park, after visitors had already obtained souvenirs from Gold Rush. They then attempted to sell their souvenirs at Ellis Island, which was a bad idea considering most of their potential customers came to Ellis Island from Gold Rush's location.
Dramatic tension: Andrea was called out as the weakest saleswoman by Allie and Roxanne in the boardroom, and Trump's opinion of her clearly changed with this discovery. There was also a dispute over how much Andrea had really sold during the task; while Allie reported that she sold poorly, Andrea claimed to have made many more sales than Allie implied and was angry that "those bitches lied" in the boardroom. Sean was torn between the ensuing politics within his team, while the rest of his teammates (who were sick of Andrea and her empty promises) decided to team up against Andrea in the boardroom and vowed that there would be "blood on the walls" when the boardroom was over. In the boardroom, Ivanka and Trump laid into Allie for her poor leadership, but she insisted that Andrea could not be managed.
Sent to boardroom: No final boardroom – After Allie condemned Andrea's victories as a project manager, this led to the revelation that Andrea's concentration lay more in business operations as opposed to sales, design, and other clerical skills. Andrea also did not deliver on any of her claims and clearly could not get along with her team. Even though Sean was the only one who defended her, he did so halfheartedly after he placed the blamed on both parties.
Fired: Andrea Lake – for a lack of business chemistry, failing to execute her specialties, not living up to her claims, and designing a bad brochure. Although Allie did very poorly as project manager for the week by leaving the design team to take matters in their own hands and not fully inspecting them enough, Trump ultimately found Andrea responsible for the loss.
Notes:
This is the first week that NBC invited cell phone users to text their predictions who would be fired for a particular week in this season of The Apprentice. The promotion is similar to Deal or No Deal, which precedes The Apprentice, and its Lucky Case text game, where cell phone users may text guesses for a case with $10,000. In both cases, all correct entries with the $10,000 case (Deal) or the fired candidate (Apprentice) are drawn at random, with one player with the correct answer winning $10,000. An alternate Internet-based voting process (Free) is available due to some states declaring the sweepstakes a "lottery" because of the entry fee.
This is the second time that both George and Carolyn were not available to evaluate the candidates; Instead, Donald's children, Donald Trump, Jr. and Ivanka Trump will be observing the candidates for this task.
This is the third week that Ivanka Trump filled in for Carolyn.
Upon returning from the boardroom, Lee lied to the others and stated that Trump wanted him to be project manager the next task. He also jokingly stated that the boardroom seat had his "a** imprinted" on it.
Allie, who had a personal tie to Ellis Island after three of her grandparents immigrated there during World War II, decided to step up as the project manager so she could make her family proud.
Gold Rush finally break their month-long losing streak.
Charmaine was unhappy with Lee's victory, as she felt that he simply got lucky to be the project manager in this task, and that they did not win because of his leadership. Ivanka expressed the view that Tarek appeared to be leading the team and was responsible for the vast majority of the successful brochure.
This is the third time someone got fired without a final boardroom in this season alone.
Episode Nine Recap on NBC.com

Week 10: Blow Out
Airdate: May 1, 2006
Hosting Company: The Hair Cuttery
Task: To celebrate a grand opening event of two Hair Cuttery franchise salons in the New York area by executing a sales event. The winning team will be determined by the amount of sales committed on their franchised salon
Judges: Donald Trump; Carolyn Kepcher; Bill Rancic
Gold Rush project manager: Charmaine
Synergy project manager: Tammy
Winning team: Synergy
Reasons for win: Despite the events of the previous boardroom creating a very bad atmosphere within the team, Tammy was able to pull them together and create an effective marketing plan, while Allie did a good job of selling the hair products to customers. Synergy had $1,005.47 worth of sales, which included $363 worth of hair products.
Reward: Write a song at the Steinway Hall with a well-respected musician Burt Bacharach
Losing team: Gold Rush
Reasons for loss: Gold Rush lacked a lot of direction throughout the planning phase during the task, due in part to Charmaine being obsessed with setting up the store (particularly the racks of hair products) correctly and refusing to let the team do any marketing until everything was to her liking. On the actual day of the task, Charmaine spent time getting her hair done instead of leading her team. Tarek and Lee had both tried to convince Charmaine that they were wasting time shelf stacking that they could use to promote the event and, unhappy with the marketing strategy on the second day, appeared to only put a minimal amount of effort into it. Gold Rush only had $700 in sales, and were outsold by $305.47.
Sent to boardroom: No final boardroom – Charmaine and Tarek viciously attacked each other as Trump silently hears the exposure that both Charmaine and Tarek bubbled out against each other; this heated argument exposed both Charmaine's very weak leadership during this task and Tarek's inability to be led during this task and in the past. Seeing this, and given that Lee and Michael were not responsible for the loss, Trump had enough evidence to fire both Charmaine and Tarek without the need for a final boardroom.
Fired:
Charmaine Hunt – for abandoning her team, having lackluster leadership throughout the entire task, failing to have any form of marketing or promotion throughout the task, and lacking the level of emotional strength required to work in the Trump organization, after Tarek revealed that she had broken down crying in both this task and in the eighth task due to arguments within the team.
Tarek Saab – in spite of not being held accountable for the loss, Tarek had proven to be excessively hard to work with and impossible to lead on several tasks and his hostility toward the other candidates in the boardroom (again on more than one occasion) didn't help his case. Trump felt Tarek's hostility, inability to be lead, and mixed performance throughout the process made it virtually impossible for him to continue.
Notes:
This is the second time (in this season) that two people were fired in one week. Unlike the second task, this firing was unannounced.
 Bill strongly criticized Charmanine for not having any efficient marketing and spending time setting up the store, saying that if they focused more on bringing in more customers there was a good chance they could've won.
Neither Charmaine nor Tarek said a single word during their taxi ride even though Trump said that they would have another argument in the taxi cab.
After Charmaine's and Tarek's firing, Lee is the final person left from the original team Gold Rush out of the final six.
Both Hair Cuttery locations were in Nassau County, Long Island (about half an hour's drive east of Manhattan.) Gold Rush worked at the outlet located at 15 Old Country Road in the village of Carle Place. Synergy's store was at 3574 Long Beach Road in Oceanside.
A few days after this episode aired, Charmaine received a franchise offer to run at least one or two franchised salons with the Hair Cuttery name.
Episode Ten Recap on NBC.com
Trump stated he had liked both Charmaine and Tarek and thought them both intelligent with much in their favor, but felt it was too obvious that they both had to go, since they both made far too many errors to continue in the process.

Week 11: Back to School
Airdate: May 8, 2006
Sponsor: Outback Steakhouse
Hosting Company: Rutgers University
Corporate shuffle: Sean volunteers to transfer to Gold Rush to even out the teams, which tilts the job process back to its inaugural roots of men versus the women.
Task: Host a tailgate party by selling food served by Outback Steakhouse during a football game using separate tents, lots, and cooks, all of which located at Rutgers University. The winning team will be determined by the amount of sales obtained.
Judges: Donald Trump; Carolyn Kepcher; George H. Ross
Gold Rush project manager: Lee
Synergy project manager: Roxanne
Winning team: Synergy
Reasons for win: While the all-male Gold Rush secured an exclusive deal with the Rutgers' cheerleaders and had a better marketing strategy from the beginning, the all-female Synergy devised an emergency plan that involved bulk selling and lot delivery to make up for their marketing handicap. This plan paid off for Synergy, who ultimately secured a win after they focused on sales, and not just about converting people to the event. The women also priced all their food for five dollars.
Reward: To create their very own signature wine at the Rafael Vineyard Estate of Long Island, New York.
Losing team: Gold Rush
Reasons for loss: According to Carolyn, Gold Rush focused too much in their events rather than converting their guests into sales. Synergy sold $2750 in food, while Gold Rush sold $1750. This was a surprising defeat for Gold Rush as they had a better marketing plan, but failed once their event took place and even Trump was surprised how badly the men lost. Lee was an overconfident project manager, and failed by not having a better sales plan once he had so many potential customers at his event.
Sent to boardroom: Lee, Sean, Michael—Gold Rush were all under internal review as Trump requested the entire team to wait at the reception area.
Firing verdict: Trump considered firing Lee, but Carolyn had issues regarding Michael and his attempt to give up on Gold Rush's exclusive deal with the cheerleaders, which showed that he had no competitive edge. George felt the team screwed up with having the wrong price point and being overconfident.
Fired: Michael Laungani – for being disloyal of the team after attempting to share the cheerleaders with Synergy and for lacking a competitive edge. He also focused too much on the events, but this was due to Lee's strategy. While Lee did not maximize his sales after all the marketing events his team organized, asset-sharing is considered a serious oversight in the business world as well. This flaw in Michael's character was too big of a critical error to be ignored.
Notes:
Sean calls Michael a "wanker" for the third time in the season. The first two times were in the 7th episode.
This was the first time that an internal review was shown since the Norwegian Cruise Line task.
The use of the correct spelling ("whilst" instead of "while") was noted during the printing of Gold Rush flyers, when Sean used the British spelling. It was noted by Lee and changed to the American version. Michael laughed at Sean for using the British spelling and said "this is not Shakespeare." 
After the firing Trump told Lee and Sean not to feel too great as they did just as poor as Michael, strongly hinting that Lee might've been fired had it not been for Michael's disloyalty.
Episode Eleven Recap on NBC.com

Week 12: Backs Against the Wal-Mart
Airdate: May 15, 2006
Sponsor: Microsoft
Hosting Company: Wal-Mart
Task: Create an interactive and three-dimensional in-store display area at Wal-Mart for customers to demo Microsoft's Xbox 360, a follow up to the original Xbox. The team that creates the most compelling Xbox 360 promotion will win by an evaluation of both Wal-Mart and Microsoft executives.
Judges: Donald Trump; Ivanka Trump; Bill Rancic
Result: Gold Rush's concept is to outsource the building of the display of the Xbox 360, leaving the duet to focus on merchandise inside the set. Tammy's idea for Synergy revolved around a Hollywood theme, and the team domestically built their own display.
Gold Rush project manager: Sean
Dramatic tension: An employee of the firm that Gold Rush hired to construct the set did not help the team with his delays and broken promises, causing Sean and Lee to face several "crunch-time" moments.
Synergy project manager: Tammy
Pain of the Task: Allie and Roxanne did not like Tammy's theme and they were not focusing on the task. Tammy had a discussion with the two in order to get them focused, but Tammy could not control them. When Bill Rancic checked Synergy's progress, Allie meant to roll her eyes in front of him; which it did not look good as Bill brought up that statement.
Winning team: Gold Rush
Reasons for win: Their environment was retail-friendly with price points and a range of different products.
Reward: To go to Hollywood to meet Jeffrey Katzenberg, one of DreamWorks' Animation Studios Executives and conduct voice-overs in the animated film Over the Hedge.
Losing team: Synergy
Reasons for loss: Synergy did a better job of explaining the main idea of their display and the entertainment value of the Xbox 360. However, the executives disliked the fact that their display looked like a personal lounge and that they did not have any price points or navigation in the display as well, while the other team had more branding system in their display.
Firing points: When being asked how many wins and losses of a project manager, Tammy brought up with her 1–2 record; which didn't make Trump really excited. And then, Trump commented that Tammy's overall Xbox 360 display "stunk", which had mirrored what Brent had said since eight weeks ago and that got him fired.
Sent to boardroom: No final boardroom
Fired: Tammy Trenta – for showing overall lack of leadership quality throughout the task, a bad overall Xbox 360 design, losing respect of the team, mediocre project manager record, and for failing to curb their insubordination from this tension. This had also not been the first time Tammy had failed as a project manager.
Notes:
 The Internet Movie Database's full credits for the film lists both Gold Rush participants as the voices for BBQ Barry and Lunch Table Larry, respectively.
See the Pre-Episode Citation
The episode aired one hour later than its normal scheduled time
Episode Twelve Recap on NBC.com

Week 13: Who Wears the Pants?
Airdate: May 22, 2006
Hosting Company: Embassy Suites Hotels
Task: Create a new line of uniforms for four different departments for Embassy Suites. Each team has access to design studios, clothing designers, and even models. The employees will determine the winner via a fashion show
Judges: Donald Trump; Ivanka Trump; Donald Trump, Jr.
Gold Rush project manager: Lee
Synergy project manager: Allie
Pain of the Task: Synergy uses their love of fashion to execute the task, but Roxanne has some issues with Allie's designs. In addition, Allie (according to Roxanne) offended clothing designer Marc Bouwer during the design phase of the task. During the fashion show, Sean and some of the Embassy Suites employees were shocked by the clothes Synergy was offering Embassy's employees.
Winning team: Gold Rush
Reasons for win: Gold Rush design their uniforms based on market research and key items that employees wanted to change. A crucial turning point was shown when Lee and Sean collaborated with their designer on fabrics. The uniforms were more comfortable and professional than Synergy's, and the uniforms they made would fit the varying body shapes of the employees better. Both Ivanka and Donald Jr. declared the loss "a very huge beating" when Ivanka said that 83 out of 120 employees preferred Gold Rush's uniforms over Synergy's 37 out of 120 employees.
Reward: An intimate dinner with Ivanka and Donald Jr. at the Aquavit plus advice on how to become Trump's newest apprentice.
Losing team: Synergy
Reasons for loss: Unlike Gold Rush's uniforms, which were more formal and comfortable, Synergy's were more riskier and flamboyant. This got a much more negative reception from the employees calling them unconformable and weird.
Sent to boardroom: No final boardroom
Fired: Both Roxanne Wilson and Allie Jablon, for not differentiating work from friendship throughout the task, and for their exposed disloyalty to each other in the boardroom. While Allie had been more at fault for Synergy's loss (because of her flamboyant designs and being rude to the clients), Trump had to let Roxanne go as well after she clearly let her friendship with Allie interfere with business, and Trump was disgusted with both of the women's lack of loyalty to each other once in the boardroom.
Notes:
Season 5 is tied for the most multi-firings in a single season (along with Season 4).
For the 2nd time over the first 5 seasons of The Apprentice, both of the remaining candidates are men, because Trump fired both Roxanne and Allie in the last boardroom session.
The revelation that Tammy had been fired in favor of Allie and Roxanne led to the friendship between Allie and Sean (which had already been strained by Allie's previous actions in getting Andrea fired) being irreparably broken. The two mended fences somewhat in the following episode, but Sean still said that he never wanted to work with her again.
 Donald Trump, Jr. and Ivanka Trump once again fill in for George and Carolyn on this task. Another interesting note is that Synergy has always failed a task when Ivanka filled in for Carolyn.
As with the previous two multiple-firings in week 2 and week 10, both Roxanne and Allie had to share a single taxi.
Unlike the previous two multiple-firings in week 2 and week 10, in which he fired Stacy and Pepi and then Charmaine and Tarek one at a time, respectively, he fired Roxanne and Allie at the same time.
Because both Allie and Roxanne were fired on this task, there will be no one-on-one interviews this season. This is the second consecutive season without the need for executive interviews, and also the second consecutive season that a company had been "permanently shut-down" by Trump.
See the Pre-Airing Citation
Episode Thirteen Recap on NBC.com

The Final Task: The Mother of All Tasks
Starting Airdate: May 29, 2006 (Week 14: Final Task)
Ending Airdate: June 5, 2006 (Week 15: Season Finale)
Sponsor: Pontiac
Prologue: Lee and Sean received a call from Robin to report back to the boardroom immediately after Allie and Roxanne got fired. In the boardroom, Trump announced that both Lee and Sean were the two finalists among over one million applicants for Trump's fifth apprentice. Following the special visit, Lee and Sean were asked to proceed back to the suite and to assemble the teams. Unlike the first four seasons, Lee and Sean get to talk to each of the sixteen fired candidates before the next morning, but as with Season 4, Lee and Sean can assemble their teams in the manner they want.
Judges: Donald Trump; Carolyn Kepcher; George H. Ross
Gold Rush's Final Task: Host a Pontiac-sponsored celebrity ice hockey game at an assigned place at the Chelsea Piers to benefit the Leary Firefighters Foundation. The ice hockey game must utilize at least one fundraising component, and that fundraising component must be approved by the charity. All net proceeds in the Ice Hockey Game will be remitted to the Leary Firefighters Foundation
Gold Rush's Executive Director: Lee
Lee's Recruits: Lenny, Pepi, Roxanne
Gold Rush Cliffhangers:
Lys didn't like the ideas Gold Rush gave for the charity event, and gave Lee a long list of events he was to run in a short amount of time.
Carolyn was concerned about Lee's leadership abilities at this point of the job interview. She was also concerned about Lee's selection of employees. Furthermore, Jaime Pressly was lost in one point of the task.
Synergy's Final Task: Host a Barenaked Ladies concert held at the Trump Taj Mahal at Atlantic City, New Jersey to benefit the World Wildlife Fund. All net proceeds from the Barenaked Ladies concert will be remitted to the World Wildlife Fund
Synergy's Executive Director: Sean
Sean's Recruits: Tammy, Andrea, Tarek
Synergy Cliffhangers:
Andrea was forced to leave the task due to bleeding from her paranasal sinuses.
The executives of Pontiac were also concerned about the lack of the Pontiac badging during Sean's event.
Notes:
Each executive director has a seed budget of $5000 USD.
Trump and his advisors didn't even remember who Pepi was, and they doubted Lee's choice of him as a recruit.
While both tasks were successful, there were a couple of mistakes as described:
Lee chose Lenny and Pepi, who did not seem to be the strongest choices for help in a final task. He also did not give enough direction, and the ones he did give appeared to be too vague.
Although Sean appeared to be pulling the team together, George thought that Sean was not supervising his employees closely enough, which bothered him.
Episode Fourteen Recap on NBC.com

Decision Time
Airdate: June 5, 2006 (Week 15: Season Finale)
The episode aired at a special time, 9:30pm ET/PT, 8:30pm CT/MT
The Apprentice finale was broadcast live from the legendary Orpheum Theater in downtown Los Angeles (foreshadowing the next season)
Both Lee and Sean chose the same job, a Trump International Hotel in the trendy SoHo neighborhood of New York City.
Sean chose New York because he "needed to learn a lot" from Trump.
Lee chose New York because it was close to where he lived.
Hired: Sean Yazbeck - for having an undefeated PM record of 2-0 (even though Lee's highest PM record of 3-1), excellent team record of 9-4, and his credentials & career ethics impressed Trump and his advisors. And for not once being called back to the Final Boardroom by other project managers.
Coronation reward: A 2006 or 2007 Pontiac G6 Hardtop Convertible
Fired: Lee Bienstock - Despite having the highest PM record of 3-1, Trump felt Lee's team record of 5-8 and his tenacity was not a good fit for the Trump Organization.
Notes:
Although Lee Bienstock was not hired on television (and much to the audiences' and viewers' surprise that Lee heard "You're fired" from Trump), due to his tenacity and credentials, he was hired outside of television by Trump to work for Trump Mortgage as an associate vice president for corporate development approximately three months after Yazbeck was hired inside of television
This is the first time viewers were able to help Trump decide who should be hired. Trump said that it was "a one-sided decision", and that he didn't agree it should be so one-sided but he agreed with it, ultimately hiring Sean. Therefore, Sean won the national vote.
While the finale was aired live (as in previous seasons), this season's finale was held in Hollywood.
Lee is the second person to hear Trump's trademark coup de grace in the finale episode, with the first being Jennifer Massey from the second season.
When Trump was talking to the previously fired candidates he told Pepi that he does know who he is even though in the previous episode he didn't recognize him.
Sean denies rumors that he would marry Tammy Trenta
Final Episode Recap on NBC.com

References

2006 American television seasons
05